Finnmarksposten is a local newspaper published in Honningsvåg, Norway. It was established in 1866.

It has a circulation of 1235, of whom 726 are subscribers.

Finnmarksposten is owned by Finnmark Dagblad since 1993, which in turn is owned 100% by A-pressen.

References
Norwegian Media Registry

External links
Website

Newspapers established in 1866
Newspapers published in Norway
Mass media in Finnmark
Nordkapp
1866 establishments in Norway
Amedia